Lisa Howard (born November 24, 1963 in London, Ontario) is a Canadian actress.

Career 
Howard appeared in episodes of Earth: Final Conflict, Tropical Heat, Perry Mason, Days of Our Lives, Wings, Forever Knight, Loving Friends and Perfect Couples, RoboCop: The Series, Cybill, The Pretender and Suddenly Susan. In 1987, she starred in the movie Rolling Vengeance. She played April Ramirez on Days of Our Lives from 1988 to 1991 and from September 1995 to February 1996. Her last credited screen role was a 2009 episode of The Royal. She portrayed Anne Lindsey in Highlander: The Series.

Personal life 
Howard is married to producer/writer Daniel Cerone and has two children.

Filmography

Film

Television

References

External links

1963 births
Actresses from London, Ontario
Canadian television actresses
Living people